Uintatherium ("Beast of the Uinta Mountains") is an extinct genus of herbivorous mammal that lived during the Eocene epoch. Two species are currently recognized: U. anceps from the United States during the Early to Middle Eocene (56–38 million years ago) and U. insperatus of Middle to Late Eocene (48–34 million years ago) China.

Description

Uintatherium was a large browsing animal. Its legs were robust to sustain the weight of the animal and were equipped with hooves. Moreover, a Uintathere's sternum was made up of horizontal segments, unlike today's rhinos, which have compressed vertical segments.

Skull

Its most unusual feature was the skull, which is both large and strongly built, but simultaneously flat and concave: this feature is rare and, apart from some brontotheres, not regularly characteristic of any other known mammal. Its cranial cavity was exceptionally small due to the walls of the cranium being exceedingly thick. The weight of the skull was mitigated by numerous sinuses permeating the walls of the cranium, like those in an elephant's skull.

The large upper canine teeth might have served as formidable defensive weapons, and superficially resembled those of saber-toothed cats. Sexually dimorphic, the teeth were larger in males than in females. However, they also might have used them to pluck the aquatic plants from marshes that seem to have comprised their diet.

The function of these structures is unknown. They may have been of use in defense and/or sexual display.

Discovery and taxonomy 
Fossils of Uintatherium were first discovered in the Bridger Basin near Fort Bridger by Lieutenant W. N. Wann in September 1870 and were later described as a new species of Titanotherium, Titanotherium anceps, by Othniel Marsh in 1871. The specimen (YPM 11030) only consisted of several skull pieces, including the right parietal horn, and fragmentary postcrania. The following year, Marsh and Joseph Leidy collected in the Eocene Beds near Fort Bridger while Edward Cope, Marsh's competitor, excavated in the Washakie Basin. In August 1872, Leidy named Uintatherium robustum based on a posterior skull and partial mandibles (ANSP 12607). Another specimen discovered by Leidy's crews consisting of a canine was named Uintamastix atrox and was thought to have been a saber-toothed and carnivorous.

Eighteen days after the description of Uintatherium, Cope and Marsh both named new genera of Uinta Dinoceratans, Cope naming Loxolophodon in his "garbled" telegram and Marsh dubbed Tinoceras. Due to Uintatherium being named first, Cope and Marsh's genera are synonymous with Uintatherium. Cope described two genera in his telegram, Loxolophodon and Eobasileus; the latter is currently considered separate from Uintatherium. Tinoceras was a new genus made for Titanotherium anceps by Marsh. Several days later, Marsh erected the genus Dinoceras. Dinoceras and Tinoceras would receive several additional species by Marsh throughout the 1870s and 1880s, many based on fragmentary material. Several complete skulls were found by Cope and Marsh crews, leading to theories like Cope's proboscidean assessment. Because of Cope and Marsh's rivalry, the two would often publish scathing criticisms of each other's work, stating their respective genera were valid. The trio would name 25 species now considered synonymous with Marsh's original species, Titanotherium anceps, which was placed in Leidy's genus, Uintatherium.

Many additional discoveries of Uintatherium have since occurred, making Uintatherium one of the best-known and popular American fossil mammals. Princeton University launched expeditions to the Eocene beds of Wyoming in the 1870s and 1880s, discovering several partial since skulls and naming several species of Uintatheres that are now considered synonyms of U. anceps. Major reassesment came in the 1960s by Walter Wheeler who synonymized and re-described many of the Uintatherium fossils discovered during the 19th century A cast of a Uintatherium skeleton is on display at the Utah Field House of Natural History State Park. The skeleton of Uintatherium is also on display at the Smithsonian National Museum of Natural History in Washington, DC. A new species was named based on almost intact skull, U. insperatus, found in the lower part of the Lushi Formation of the Lushi Basin in Henan Province, China.

References

Further reading
Academy of Natural Sciences
National Park Service
Wood, Horace Elmer 1923, The problem of the Uintatherium molars, Bulletin of the American Museum of Natural History ; v. 48, article 18
Fossil Evidence – Eocene: Smithsonian National Museum of Natural History

Dinoceratans
Eocene mammals of North America
 
Fossil taxa described in 1872
Taxa named by Joseph Leidy
Paleontology in Wyoming
Paleontology in Utah
Paleontology in Henan
Prehistoric placental genera